Prescott Township may refer to:

 Prescott Township, Adams County, Iowa
 Prescott Township, Faribault County, Minnesota
 Prescott Township, Renville County, North Dakota, in Renville County, North Dakota

Township name disambiguation pages